Steffen Klusmann (born 15 March 1966) is a German journalist and editor-in-chief of Hamburg magazine Der Spiegel. Since November 2013 he has been editor-in-chief of the Manager Magazin.

Previously, Klusmann was deputy editor-in-chief at magazines such as Stern, Financial Times Deutschland, Capital and Business Punk.

Life 
Klusmann studied economics in Mainz, Glasgow and Hamburg. After his training at the Georg von Holtzbrinck School for Business Journalists in Düsseldorf, he worked for several years as an editor in the Department of Economics and Politics for the journal WirtschaftsWoche. From 1996, he reported for Manager Magazin on trends in economic policy and technology. In 1999 he moved to the editorial department of the new newspaper Financial Times Deutschland (FTD), which appeared in February 2000. He was initially responsible for background reports and comments, later becoming chief on duty. In 2003, Klusmann briefly returned to Manager Magazin, where he held the position of deputy editor-in-chief. In August 2004 he went back to the FTD, where he received the editor-in-chief position as successor to Christoph Keese. On 1 April 2009 he was also assigned the same position at Capital.

He was also spokesman for the editors-in-chief of the Gruner + Jahr business media. After hiring the FTD, he moved in March 2013 as deputy editor-in-chief of the star. From November 2013 to August 2018 Steffen Klusmann was editor-in-chief of Manager Magazin.

On 22 August 2018 it was announced that Klusmann would succeed Klaus Brinkbäumer as chairman of the editorship of Der Spiegel, responsible for both the printed magazine as well as for the news portal "Spiegel Online".

Other activities 
Klusmann is an honorary jury member at "Top 100", an award for the most innovative medium-sized companies in Germany.

Publications 
Klusmann is editor of several books:

 Green minds. The German pioneers of the Greentech era. FinanzBuch-Verlag, Munich 2010.
 Daughters of the German economy. FinanzBuch-Verlag, Munich 2008.
 101 warriors of the German economy. FinanzBuch-Verlag, Munich 2006.

References

External links 
 Literature by and about Steffen Klusmann in the catalog of the German national library

1966 births
Living people
German journalists
German male journalists
German business and financial journalists
Der Spiegel editors
German magazine editors